A coalition government is a cabinet of a government in which several parties cooperate. The usual reason given for this arrangement is that no party on its own can achieve a majority in the parliament. A coalition government might also be created in a time of national difficulty or crisis, for example during wartime, to give a government the high degree of perceived political legitimacy it desires whilst also playing a role in diminishing internal political strife. In such times, parties have formed all-party coalitions (national unity governments, grand coalitions). If a coalition collapses, a confidence vote is held or a motion of no confidence is taken.

For the purposes of this list, coalitions can come in two forms. The first is produced by two or more parties joining forces after fighting elections separately to form a majority government. However, some coalitions (or alliances) are already decided before elections to give the parties the best chance of immediate government after the election.

Europe

Countries
 Armenia: Civil Contract, United Labour Party
 Belgium: Christian Democratic and Flemish, Reformist Movement, Open Flemish Liberals and Democrats, Socialist Party, Vooruit, Ecolo, Green.
 Bulgaria: We Continue the Change, BSP for Bulgaria, There Is Such a People, Democratic Bulgaria
 Croatia: Croatian Democratic Union, Independent Democratic Serb Party
 Cyprus:
 Czech Republic: SPOLU (Civic Democratic Party, KDU-ČSL, TOP 09), PaS (Pirate Party, Mayors and Independents)
 Denmark: Social Democrats, Venstre, Moderates
 Estonia: Estonian Reform Party, Isamaa, Social Democratic Party
 Finland: Social Democratic Party, Centre Party, Green League, Left Alliance, Swedish People's Party
 France: Ensemble Citoyens (Democratic Movement, En Commun, Horizons, Radical Party, Renaissance)
 Germany: Social Democratic Party, Greens, Free Democratic Party
 Hungary: Fidesz-KDNP (Fidesz, Christian Democratic People's Party)
 Iceland: Independence Party, Progressive Party, Left-Green Movement.
 Italy: Brothers of Italy, Lega, Forza Italia, Us Moderates.
 Kosovo: Vetëvendosje, Guxo!, Progressive Democratic Party, Turkish Democratic Party of Kosovo, New Democratic Party, New Democratic Initiative, Vakat Coalition, Progressive Movement of Kosovar Roma, Social Democratic Union.
 Latvia: New Unity, United List, National Alliance.
 Lithuania: Homeland Union, Liberal Movement, Freedom Party
 Luxembourg: Democratic Party, Luxembourg Socialist Workers' Party, The Greens.
 Monaco: Union for the Principality, National Union for the Future of Monaco, Promotion of the Monegasque Family.
 Montenegro: Socialist People's Party, United Reform Action, Social Democratic Party, Bosniak Party, Albanian List, Albanian Coalition, Civis, Croatian Civic Initiative.
 Netherlands: People's Party for Freedom and Democracy,  D66, Christian Democratic Appeal, Christian Union.
 North Macedonia: We Can (Social Democratic Union of North Macedonia, New Social Democratic Party, VMRO – People's Party, Democratic Party of Turks, Party for the Movement of the Turks in North Macedonia, Party of United Pensioners and Citizens of Macedonia, Serbian Party in Macedonia), Democratic Union for Integration, Alternativa, Liberal Democratic Party, Democratic Party of Albanians, Democratic Renewal of Macedonia, Democratic Union.
 Norway: Labour Party, Centre Party.
 Poland: Law and Justice, United Poland, Republican Party, Renewal, Polish Affairs.
 Ireland: Fianna Fáil, Fine Gael, Green Party
 Romania: PSD, PNL, UDMR
 San Marino: Sammarinese Christian Democratic Party, RETE Movement, Domani Motus Liberi, We for the Republic.
 Serbia: Serbian Progressive Party, Socialist Party of Serbia, Movement of Socialists, Party of United Pensioners of Serbia, Social Democratic Party of Serbia
 Slovakia: Ordinary People and Independent Personalities, Freedom and Solidarity, We Are Family, For The People
 Slovenia: Freedom Movement, Social Democrats, The Left
 Spain: Spanish Socialist Workers' Party, Unidas Podemos.
 Switzerland: Social Democratic Party, Free Democratic Party, The Centre, Swiss People's Party.
 Ukraine: Servant of the People
 United Kingdom:
 Northern Ireland:  
 Scotland: SNP, Greens

Dependencies
 Åland: Åland Centre, Moderate Coalition, Non-aligned Coalition, Sustainable Initiative
 Faroe Islands: Social Democratic Party, Republic, Progress.

The Americas

Countries
 Argentina: Frente de Todos (Justicialist Party, Patria Grande Front, Renewal Front)
 Colombia: Colombian Liberal Party, Historic Pact for Colombia, Colombian Conservative Party, Union Party for the People, Green Alliance, Commons, Independent Social Alliance, Indigenous Authorities of Colombia, Indigenous and Social Alternative Movement.
 Chile: Apruebo Dignidad (Communist Party, Social Convergence, Democratic Revolution, Commons, Social Green Regionalist Federation), Democratic Socialism (Socialist Party, Party for Democracy, Radical Party, Liberal Party).
 Dominican Republic: Modern Revolutionary Party, Dominican Humanist Party, Alliance for Democracy, Revolutionary Social Democratic Party, Quisqueyano Christian Democratic Party, Social Democratic Institutional Bloc, Civic Renovation Party, Broad Front, Dominicans for Change
 Honduras: Liberty and Refoundation, Savior Party of Honduras, Christian Democratic Party of Honduras, Innovation and Unity Party.
 Mexico: MORENA, Ecologist Green Party, Labor Party.
 Panama: Democratic Change, Panameñista Party, Patriotic Union, Nationalist Republican Liberal Movement.
 Suriname: Progressive Reform Party, General Liberation and Development Party, National Party of Suriname, Pertjajah Luhur.
 Uruguay: National Party, Colorado Party, Open Cabildo, Independent Party, Partido de la Gente.

Dependencies
 Curaçao: Movement for the Future of Curaçao, National People's Party.
 Greenland: Community of the People, Naleraq.
 Sint Maarten: National Alliance, United People's Party.

Africa
 Algeria: National Liberation Front, National Rally for Democracy, Movement of Society for Peace.
 Democratic Republic of the Congo: Union of Mobutuist Democrats, People's Party for Reconstruction and Democracy, Unified Lumumbist Party, Social Movement for Renewal, Coalition of Congolese Democrats, Federalist Christian Democracy-Convention of Federalists for Christian Democracy, Christian Democrat Party (Democratic Republic of the Congo), United Congolese Convention, National Alliance Party for Unity, Union for Federalist Nationalists of Congo, Alliance for the Renewal of Congo.
 Gabon: Gabonese Democratic Party, National Woodcutters' Rally – Rally for Gabon, Democratic and Republican Alliance, Circle of Reformist Liberals, Social Democratic Party, Rally of Republican Democrats, African Development Movement.
 Guinea-Bissau: African Independence Party of Guinea and Cape Verde, Party for Social Renewal.
 Kenya: Jubilee Party of Kenya (an alliance of the National Alliance TNA and United Republican Party), NASA Faction led by Raila Odinga.
 Lesotho: All Basotho Convention, Alliance of Democrats, Basotho National Party, Reformed Congress of Lesotho.
 Mali: Alliance for Democracy in Mali, Union for the Republic and Democracy, Patriotic Movement for Renewal, National Congress for Democratic Initiative, Union for Democracy and Development, Movement for the Independence, Renaissance, and Integration of Africa, Party for Solidarity and Progress, Alternation Bloc for Renewal, Integration, and African Cooperation, Bloc for Democracy and African Integration, Citizens' Party for Revival, National Rally for Democracy, Sudanese Union-African Democratic Rally.
 Mauritania: Rally of Democratic Forces, Union of Forces of Progress, Independents.
 Mauritius: Mauritian Labour Party, Militant Socialist Movement, Mauritian Social Democrat Party.
 Morocco: National Rally of Independents, Authenticity and Modernity Party, Istiqlal Party .
 Rwanda; Rwandan Patriotic Front, Social Democratic Party, Liberal Party.
 Senegal: Alliance for the Republic, Alliance of the Forces of Progress.

Asia
 China / Taiwan : Chinese Communist Party-led United Front, Kuomintang-led Pan-Blue coalition, Democratic Progressive Party-led Pan-Green coalition
 Cambodia: Cambodian People's Party, Funcinpec Party.
 India: Bharatiya Janata Party, Balasahebanchi Shiv Sena, Rashtriya Lok Janshakti Party, All India Anna Dravida Munnetra Kazhagam, Apna Dal (Sonelal), National People's Party, Mizo National Front, Nationalist Democratic Progressive Party, Sikkim Krantikari Morcha.
 Indonesia: Indonesian Democratic Party of Struggle (PDI-P), Golkar, Great Indonesia Movement Party (Gerindra), Nasdem Party, National Awakening Party (PKB), United Development Party (PPP), National Mandate Party (PAN), Indonesian Solidarity Party (PSI), Perindo Party.
 Iraq: Islamic Dawa Party, Patriotic Union of Kurdistan, Iraqi Islamic Party, Kurdistan Democratic Party, Supreme Islamic Iraqi Council, Islamic Dawa Party - Iraq Organisation, Sadrist Movement, Iraqi National Accord, National Democratic Party, Iraqi Communist Party, Islamic Action Organisation, Kurdistan Islamic Union, Independents.
 Israel: Likud, Shas, Otzma Yehudit, Religious Zionist Party, United Torah Judaism, Noam
 Kyrgyzstan: Ata-Jurt Kyrgyzstan, Ishenim, Yntymak.
 Japan: Liberal Democratic Party, Komeito
 Lebanon: Future Movement, Azm Movement, Syrian Social Nationalist Party, Tashnag, Progressive Socialist Party, Free Patriotic Movement, Marada Movement, Amal Movement, Hezbollah, Independents.
 Malaysia: Pakatan Harapan, Barisan Nasional, Gabungan Parti Sarawak, Gabungan Rakyat Sabah, Heritage Party, Social Democratic Harmony Party, Parti Bangsa Malaysia and Independents
 Maldives: Maldivian Democratic Party, Jumhooree Party
 Nepal: Communist Party of Nepal (Marxist-Leninist), Communist Party of Nepal (Maoist), Rastriya Swatantra Party, Rastriya Prajatantra Party, People's Socialist Party, Janamat Party
 Pakistan: Pakistan Muslim League (Nawaz), Pakistan People's Party, Muttahida Majlis-e-Amal, Muttahida Qaumi Movement-Pakistan, Balochistan Awami Party, Balochistan National Party (Mengal), Pakistan Muslim League (Q), Jamhoori Wattan Party.
 Palestine: Fatah, Hamas.
 Philippines: PDP–Laban, Lakas–CMD, Laban ng Demokratikong Pilipino, Nacionalista Party, Nationalist People's Coalition, National Unity Party.
 Sri Lanka: Sri Lanka Podujana Peramuna, Eelam People's Democratic Party, United National Party
 Thailand: Palang Pracharath, Democrat, Bhumjaithai, Chartthaipattana, Action Coalition for Thailand, Chart Pattana, Thai Local Power, Thai Forest Conservation, Thai Nation Power Party, People's Progressive Party, Thai Civilized Party, Palang Thai Rak Thai Party, Teachers' for People Party, Prachaniyom Party, Thai People Justice Party, Thai Citizens Power Party, New Democracy Party, New Palangdharma Party.
 Timor-Leste: Fretilin, People's Liberation Party,  KHUNTO, Democratic Party.

Oceania
 New Zealand: Labour Party, Greens.
 Papua New Guinea: National Alliance Party, People's Action Party, People's National Congress Party, People's Democratic Movement, United Resources Party, Pangu Party, United Party (Papua New Guinea), Melanesian Alliance Party.
 Solomon Islands: Reform Democratic Party, Democratic Party, Ownership, Unity and Responsibility Party, Rural and Urban Political Party, People's Congress Party, Rural Development Party, People's Federation Party, Independent Democratic Party, Independents.
 Tonga: Democratic Party of the Friendly Islands, People's Democratic Party, Independents.
 Vanuatu: Union of Moderate Parties, Labour Party, Our Land Party, Republican Party, National United Party, Namangi Aute, Family First Party.

References

 
Countries with coalition governments
Coalition governments